This City may refer to:

This City (band), Brighton rave band
"This City" (Steve Earle song), Grammy nominated song by Steve Earle written for the TV show Treme 2011
"This City" (Patrick Stump song), 2011
"This City" (Sam Fischer song), 2019
"This City", song by Snoop Dogg from Bush 2015